Ohad Elhelo (Hebrew: אוהד אלחלו) is an Israeli social entrepreneur and public speaker. In 2014, Elhelo founded Our Generation Speaks and has since served as executive director. In 2017, he co-founded a technology productivity company called Delegate.

Education and career 
Following the completion of his service in the Israel Defense Forces as an intelligence officer, Elhelo moved to Boston to begin his studies at Brandeis University as a Sylvia and Joseph Slifka Israeli Coexistence Scholar. In 2016, he received his bachelor's degree in Economics and continued his studies at the Brandeis International Business School, working towards a master's degree in International Economics and Finance. He received his master's degree in May 2017.

While a junior in college, Elhelo founded Our Generation Speaks (OGS). OGS is a fellowship program and startup incubator whose mission is to bring together young Israeli and Palestinian leaders through entrepreneurship. In 2016, he initiated partnerships between OGS and the Heller School for Social Policy and Management and MassChallenge to launch the fellowship program. To date, the venture has raised nearly $4 million.

For his work pertaining to the Israeli-Palestinian conflict, he has been featured as a speaker at universities, synagogues, and in public forums across the United States.

In 2017, Elhelo co-founded Delegate, a technology productivity company that offers a "Chief of Stuff" service. It describes itself as "a one-stop-shop for people who imagine their life unburdened from the timesuck of personal tasks." The company is currently in private beta testing and accepting new users to its waitlist.

References

Living people
Israeli businesspeople
Social entrepreneurs
Brandeis University alumni
1989 births